The 2020 FedEx Cup Playoffs, the series of three golf tournaments that determined the season champion on the U.S.-based PGA Tour, was played from August 20 to September 7. It included the following three events:
The Northern Trust – TPC Boston, Norton, Massachusetts
BMW Championship – Olympia Fields Country Club, Olympia Fields, Illinois
Tour Championship – East Lake Golf Club, Atlanta, Georgia

This was the 14th FedEx Cup playoffs since their inception in 2007.

The point distributions can be seen here.

Regular season rankings

Source:

The Northern Trust
The Northern Trust was played August 20–23. Of the 125 players eligible to play in the event, two did not play: Vaughn Taylor (ranked 75th) withdrew with a rib injury and Brooks Koepka (ranked 97th) withdrew with knee and hip injuries, reducing the field to 123. Scottie Scheffler scored 59 for his second round, becoming the 11th player to score under 60 in a PGA Tour event. Dustin Johnson led after two rounds after a second round 60, two ahead of Scheffler and Cameron Davis. 70 players made the second-round cut at 139 (−3).

Dustin Johnson won by 11 strokes over Harris English after further rounds of 64 and 63. The top 70 players in the points standings advanced to the BMW Championship. This included six players who were outside the top 70 prior to The Northern Trust: Alex Norén (ranked 78th to 47th), Harry Higgs (72 to 48), Russell Henley (101 to 61), Robby Shelton (81 to 62), Jason Kokrak (90 to 66), and Louis Oosthuizen (99 to 70). Six players started the tournament within the top 70 but ended the tournament outside the top 70, ending their playoff chances: Doc Redman (ranked 60th to 71st), Kang Sung-hoon (61 to 72), Denny McCarthy (65 to 73), Phil Mickelson (67 to 75), Henrik Norlander (68 to 76), and Zhang Xinjun (70 to 78).	

Par 71 course

BMW Championship
The BMW Championship was played August 27–30. Of the 70 players eligible to play in the event, one did not play: Webb Simpson (ranked 3rd) withdrew to rest, reducing the field to 69. He was already guaranteed a place in the Tour Championship. There was no second-round cut.

Jon Rahm beat Dustin Johnson with a birdie at the first playoff hole after the two had tied at 276, 4-under-par. The top 30 players in the points standings advanced to the Tour Championship. This included two players who were outside the top 30 prior to the BMW Championship: Joaquín Niemann (ranked 31st to 18th) and Mackenzie Hughes (36 to 28). Two players started the tournament within the top 30 but ended the tournament outside the top 30, ending their playoff chances: Adam Long (27 to 31) and Kevin Streelman (28 to 32).

Par 70 course

Points after BMW Championship

Tour Championship
The Tour Championship was played September 4–7 and was contested by the leading 30 players in the FedEx Cup points standings after the BMW Championship, with no second-round cut. Players were allocated a starting score relative to par based on their position in the standings after the BMW Championship. The points leader started the tournament at 10 under par, number two at 8 under par, number three at 7 under par, number four at 6 under par and number five at 5 under par. Players ranked 6 to 10 started at 4 under par, 11 to 15 at 3 under par, 16 to 20 at 2 under par, 21 to 25 at 1 under par and 26 to 30 started at even par. The winner of the Tour Championship wins the FedEx Cup. For the purposes of the Official World Golf Ranking, points are awarded based on aggregate scores (total strokes taken, ignoring any starting scores).

Dustin Johnson won by three strokes from Xander Schauffele and Justin Thomas. Schauffele, who had started 7 strokes behind Johnson, had the best 72-hole aggregate score of 265, three better than Scottie Scheffler and four better than Johnson and Thomas.

Par 70 course

For the full list see here.

Table of qualified players
Table key:

* First-time Playoffs qualifier

References

External links
Coverage on the PGA Tour's official site

FedEx Cup
PGA Tour
PGA Tour events
FedEx Cup Playoffs
FedEx Cup Playoffs
FedEx Cup Playoffs
FedEx Cup Playoffs